Aluf (Major General, res.) Uzi Dayan (born January 4, 1948) is a former general in the Israel Defense Forces and an Israeli politician. He served as a member of the Knesset for Likud from 2020 to 2021.

Biography
Uzi Dayan is a nephew of Moshe Dayan, grandson of Shmuel Dayan and cousin of Assi Dayan, Yael Dayan and Yehonatan Geffen. His father, Zorik, was killed in the Battle of Ramat Yohanan in April of the year he was born.  His mother Mimi remarried in March 1950 after having met Moshe Rabinovitch in Rome the previous summer. They had two children of their own, Dan (b. 1951) and Michal (b. 1956).  Dayan was raised in HaYogev.

Dayan was an undergraduate at Hebrew University of Jerusalem, where he studied under Robert Aumann and received a B.Sc. in mathematics and physics.  He subsequently studied at Stanford University, earning an M.Sc. in operations research.

Dayan is married to Prof. Tamar Dayan, the daughter of Igal Talmi. They have three children, one son Itai and two daughters Aviva, Zohar  and reside in Kokhav Ya'ir.

Military career

Dayan served in the Sayeret Matkal from 1966 to 2002 and became commander of the unit. He served as head of Central Command, Deputy Chief of Staff, and headed the Israeli National Security Council (2000–2002). He was a member and later head of an elite commando unit that reportedly made eight to ten attempts to assassinate Yasser Arafat.

Political career
Dayan was a founder of the Tafnit party which ran in the 2006 legislative elections. In mid-2008, the party joined Likud.

References

External links

1948 births
Living people
Uzi
Israeli generals
People from Afula
Hebrew University of Jerusalem alumni
Israeli people of Ukrainian-Jewish descent
Stanford University alumni
Members of the 21st Knesset (2019)
Members of the 23rd Knesset (2020–2021)